The men's track time trial in Cycling at the 1992 Summer Olympics was a time trial race in which each of the thirty-two cyclists attempted to set the fastest time for four laps (1 kilometre) of the track. The race was held on Monday, July 27 at the Velòdrom d'Horta. Adler Capelli rode a bike that allowed for a single gear change, a first for an Olympic track event. There were 32 competitors from 32 nations, with each nation limited to one cyclist. The event was won by José Manuel Moreno of Spain, the nation's first medal in the men's track time trial. The United States also earned its first medal in the event, with Erin Hartwell's bronze. Shane Kelly took Australia's second consecutive silver medal in the track time trial.

Background

This was the 16th appearance of the event, which had previously been held in 1896 and every Games since 1928. It would be held every Games until being dropped from the programme after 2004. The returning cyclists from 1988 were gold medalist Aleksandr Kirichenko of the Soviet Union (now competing for the Unified Team), seventeenth-place finisher Mika Hämäläinen of Finland, nineteenth-place finisher Nelson Mario Pons of Ecuador, and thirtieth-place finisher Neil Lloyd of Antigua and Barbuda. Host nation Spain had the reigning world champion, José Manuel Moreno.

Indonesia and Latvia each made their debut in the men's track time trial; some former Soviet republics competed as the Unified Team. France made its 16th appearance, the only nation to have competed at every appearance of the event.

Competition format

The event was a time trial on the track, with each cyclist competing separately to attempt to achieve the fastest time. Each cyclist raced one kilometre from a standing start.

Records

The following were the world and Olympic records prior to the competition.

No new world or Olympic records were set during the competition.

Schedule

All times are Central European Summer Time (UTC+2)

Results

References

External links
Official Olympic Report

M
Cycling at the Summer Olympics – Men's track time trial
Track cycling at the 1992 Summer Olympics
Men's events at the 1992 Summer Olympics